The Porcelaine  is a breed of dog originating from France. In 1844, this scent hound was originally called “Briquets Francs Comtois” and named after a French region bordering Switzerland.

Appearance

The Porcelaine gets its name from its shiny coat, said to make it resemble a porcelain statuette.  The fur is white, sometimes with orange spots, often on the ears. The skin should be white with black mottling that is visible through the white coat. The fur is incredibly short and very fine. The nose of a Porcelaine dog is black with very wide nostrils. It also has black eyes and long ears that droop down. The neck is long and the tail starts thick and narrows to a point at the end.

Porcelaine males range from 22 to 23 inches (about 56 to 58.5 centimeters) tall. Bitches are 21 to 22 inches (about 53.5 to 56 centimeters) tall. They weigh from 55 to 62 pounds (about 25 to 28 kilograms).

Temperament
Porcelaines have a very high activity level and therefore need a great amount of exercise. Because of this, they are not recommended for people living in apartments because they cannot get sufficient exercise without much work on the owner's part. Despite the Porcelaines being fierce hunters, they are gentle and relatively easy to handle.

History
The Porcelaine is thought to be a descendant of the English Harrier, some of the smaller Laufhounds of Switzerland, and the now-extinct Montaimboeuf. There have been records of the breed in France since 1845 and in Switzerland since 1880. The breed actually disappeared after the French Revolution (1789–99) but has been reconstructed.
Breeders in the UK are attempting to have the Porcelaine accepted as a recognized breed.  As of 2009 there have been 14 puppies bred in the UK.

Health
Porcelaines have no health issues specific to the breed. Of course, they suffer from general dog issues like any other breed.

Care
The coat, due to its length, is very easy to care for.

Hunting purposes
The Porcelaine is a hunting dog usually used to hunt hare, roe deer, and in the north wild boar. The Porcelaines hunt in packs. Being a scent hound, it has a very good sense of smell with which it hunts. The Porcelaine is a fierce hunting dog that has been bred to hunt independently without many orders from the owner. The Porcelaine is also being bred in small numbers in Italy and used to hunt wild boar, however Italian indigenous hounds continue to be the preferred choice of local hunters.

See also
 Dogs portal
 List of dog breeds

References

External links
Club du Porcelaine 

FCI breeds
Rare dog breeds
Scent hounds
Dog breeds originating in France